Impressions of Cleopatra is an album by flautist Paul Horn featuring a jazz interpretation of Alex North's musical score for the 1963 film, Cleopatra which was originally released on the Columbia label.

Reception

AllMusic awarded the album 2 stars.

Track listing
All compositions by Alex North
 "Caesar and Cleopatra Theme" - 3:55
 "Cleopatra's Palace Music" - 3:43
 "Love and Hate" - 3:03
 "Grant Me an Honorable Way to Die" - 7:03
 "Antony and Cleopatra Theme" - 4:01
 "Cleopatra Enters Rome" - 4:51
 "My Love Is My Master" - 3:20
 "A Gift for Caesar" - 3:40

Personnel
Paul Horn - flute
Emil Richards - vibraphone
Victor Feldman - piano
Chuck Israels - bass
Colin Bailey - drums
Larry Bunker - percussion

References

Paul Horn (musician) albums
1963 albums
Albums produced by Irving Townsend
Columbia Records albums